Cassa Depositi e Prestiti Reti S.p.A. (also known as CDP Reti) is an Italian holding company. It is a joint venture of Cassa Depositi e Prestiti, State Grid Corporation and other investors.

The company owned 28.98% shares of Snam and 29.85% shares of Terna, as the largest shareholders.

In 2014 Cassa Depositi e Prestiti, the Italian state-owned investment bank, sold 35% shares of CDP Reti to State Grid Corporation, a state-owned company of China, for €2.1 billion. CDP also sold an additional 3.26% shares to banking foundations, most of which already were a minority shareholders of CDP.

In 2015 the company issued senior unsecured bond to raise €750 million.

Shareholders of CDP Reti

 Cassa Depositi e Prestiti (59.1%)
 State Grid Europe (35%)
 Cassa Nazionale di Previdenza e Assistenza Forense (2.63%)
 bank foundations of Italy (3.26%)
 Compagnia di San Paolo (0.47%)
 Fondazione Cassa di Risparmio di Modena (0.38%)
 Fondazione Cassa di Risparmio di Biella (0.23%)
 Istituto Banco di Napoli Fondazione (0.19%)
 Fondazione Banco di Sardegna (0.19%)
 Fondazione Cariplo (0.19%)
 Fondazione Cassa di Risparmio di Forlì (0.19%)
 Fondazione Varrone – Cassa di Risparmio di Rieti (0.19%)
 Fondazione Cassa di Risparmio di Calabria e Lucania (0.09%)
 Fondazione Cassa di Risparmio di Carpi (0.09%)
 Fondazione Cassa di Risparmio di Cuneo (0.09%)
 Fondazione Cassa di Risparmio di Fano (0.09%)
 Fondazione Cassa di Risparmio di Lucca (0.09%)
 Fondazione Cassa di Risparmio di Pistoia e Pescia (0.09%)
 Fondazione Cassa di Risparmio Salernitana (0.08%)
 Fondazione Cassa di Risparmio di Perugia (0.07%)
 Fondazione Carisbo (0.06%)
 Fondazione Carispezia (0.06%)
 Fondazione Cassa di Risparmio di Trento e Rovereto (0.06%)
 Fondazione Cassa di Risparmio di Udine e Pordenone (0.06%)
 Fondazione Cassa di Risparmio di Gorizia (0.05%)
 Fondazione Pescarabruzzo (0.05%)
 Fondazione Cassa di Risparmio di Imola (0.038%)
 Fondazione Cassa di Risparmio di Mirandola (0.038%)
 Fondazione Cassa di Risparmio di Vercelli (0.038%)
 Fondazione Livorno (0.038%)
 Fondazione Cassa di Risparmio di Bolzano (0.03%)
 Fondazione Cassa di Risparmio di Fermo (0.02%)
 Fondazione Cassa di Risparmio di Saluzzo (0.02%)
 Fondazione Cassa di Risparmio di Volterra (0.02%)
 Fondazione Monte di Parma (0.02%)
 Fondazione Cassa di Risparmio di Rimini (0.01%)
 Fondazione Banca del Monte e Cassa di Risparmio di Faenza (0.00%)

References

External links
 

Companies based in Rome
Holding companies of Italy
Holding companies established in 2012
2012 establishments in Italy
Government-owned companies of Italy